Kawauchi Dam is a gravity dam located in Aomori Prefecture in Japan. The dam is used for flood control. The catchment area of the dam is 48 km2. The dam impounds about 147  ha of land when full and can store 16500 thousand cubic meters of water. The construction of the dam was started on 1973 and completed in 1994.

References

Dams in Aomori Prefecture
1994 establishments in Japan